Offa was King of Mercia, a kingdom of Anglo-Saxon England, from 757 until his death in July 796.

Offa may also refer to:

Offa (name)
Offa of Angel (fl. 5th century) 
Offa of Essex (fl. 700)
Offa of Mercia 
the father of Æscwine of Essex (fl. late 5th century)
  (named for Offa of Mercia)
 Office for Fair Access, United Kingdom, promotes fair access to higher education

Places
 Offa, Ivory Coast, a village in Lagunes District, Ivory Coast
 Offa, Kwara, a town in Nigeria
 Offa, Wrexham, a community in Wrexham County Borough, Wales
 Offa (woreda), a district in the Southern Nations, Nationalities, and Peoples' Region, Ethiopia